Francisca Flores Cariola (born 25 October 1985) is a former field hockey player from Chile, who played as a defender.

Personal life
Francisca Flores has a younger sister, Fernanda, who also played international hockey for Chile.

Career

Junior national team
Flores made her debut for the Chile U–21 team in 2005 at the Pan American Junior Championship in San Juan. Later that year she represented the team at the FIH Junior World Cup in her hometown, Santiago.

Las Diablas
In 2006, Flores made her debut for Las Diablas at the South American Games in Buenos Aires.

Flores went on to make represent the national team over a nine-year period. Most notably, in 2009 she won a bronze medal at the Pan American Cup in Hamilton. She made her final appearance for the national team in 2015 during the 2014–15 FIH World League.

References

External links

1985 births
Living people
Chilean female field hockey players
Female field hockey defenders
Sportspeople from Santiago
South American Games silver medalists for Chile
South American Games medalists in field hockey
Competitors at the 2006 South American Games
20th-century Chilean women
21st-century Chilean women